Travels with Herodotus (Polish: Podróże z Herodotem) is a non-fiction book written by the Polish journalist, Ryszard Kapuściński, published in 2004.  The book mixes together a collection of Kapuściński's own experiences and philosophical themes with excerpts from the book The Histories by Herodotus which serves not only as a companion in his often long and lonely journeys but also as a guide to the conflicts that waged in current times (such as East vs. West and the debate over whether many European customs originally came from Africa). The book was translated into English by Klara Glowczewska.

See also
Polish literature
List of Polish writers

References

Kapuściński, Ryszard. Travels with Herodotus, Random House.com, Accessed: July 28, 2007
Morrison, Donald. Fellow Travlers. Time magazine, July 7, 2007. Accessed: October 18, 2007.

External links
Podróże z Herodotem

2004 non-fiction books
Travel books
Herodotus
Polish non-fiction books
Books by Ryszard Kapuściński